HTMS Sukhothai (FS-442) was a corvette of the  operated by the Royal Thai Navy that was launched in 1986. 

On 18 December 2022 in the Gulf of Thailand, high winds and strong waves caused seawater to flow into the warship; this flooding caused the engines to fail, and the pumps also became unusable. Sukhothai continued to take on water until eventually sinking overnight. , the Royal Thai Navy had rescued 76 sailors and found 24 dead. Five people remained missing.

Characteristics 
Sukhothai was a  corvette. The intended role of the Ratanakosin-class vessels was to provide surface-to-surface and surface-to-air missile capability on a highly maneuverable platform.

The class shares characteristics with the Royal Saudi Navy . The crew complement was 87, of which 15 were officers, plus an expected contingent of flag officer's staff.

Sukhothai was armed with two quadruple McDonnell Douglas Harpoon anti-ship missile launchers. She also had an octuple Selenia's Aspide surface-to-air missile launcher. The ship's gunnery was provided by one OTO Melara 76 mm gun supported by a twin Breda 40 mm cannon and a Rheinmetall 20 mm autocannon. Her torpedo armament was two triple-Mark 32 Surface Vessel Torpedo Tubes armed with Sting Ray torpedoes.

Service history 

Ordered for the Royal Thai Navy on 9 May 1983, the ship was laid down by Tacoma Boatbuilding Company in Tacoma, Washington, United States, on 26 March 1984. Sukhothai was launched on 20 July 1986. The ship was the last major vessel to be completed at Tacoma Boatbuilding's Yard 1 on the Hylebos Waterway. Sukhothai was commissioned into the Royal Thai Navy on 10 June 1987. She was originally given hull number 2, but this was later changed to 442.

In 1994 Sukhothai was part of the Royal Thai Navy contingent in the annual Thai-Australian military exercise AUSTHAI 94. Sukhothai launched several Aspide surface-to-air missiles against drone targets during the Cooperation Afloat Readiness and Training Cruise 1995 (CARAT 95), a maritime exercise cooperation with vessels from the United States, Singapore, Malaysia, the Philippines, and Brunei. This was the first time that the Royal Thai Navy had fired the missiles since purchasing them in 1985.

2022 sinking 
A weather advisory for the area had been issued by the Thailand Meteorological Department, warning of  waves and advising ships to "proceed with caution". She was caught in a storm on 18 December. Seawater entering an exhaust port led to flooding and a heavy list, followed by a short circuit in the ship's electrical system and failure of the pumps. This flooding caused the engines to fail, and the pumps became unusable. The ship sank on 18 December at around 23:30 local time (UTC+07:00) at coordinates .

Other naval ships and helicopters were sent to assist, but only  reached the vessel before she sank. , the Royal Thai Navy had rescued 76 sailors and found 24 dead. Five people remained missing.

Commander-in-chief of the Royal Thai Navy admiral Choengchai Chomchoengpaet said that there were not enough life jackets on board the ship for the regular crew plus thirty extra people who were to take part in a ceremony, but that the chances of survival were the same with or without life jackets.

The Royal Thai Navy said it planned to raise and salvage the sunken ship due to environmental and safety concerns, also expressing a desire to refit the warship. The navy has specified that the warship should be recovered whole and mostly intact. While the bidders are confident this can be accomplished, the planning and salvage will take time.

References 

1986 ships
2022 disasters in Asia
2022 in Thailand
December 2022 events in Thailand
Corvettes of the Royal Thai Navy
Maritime incidents in 2022
Ships built by Tacoma Boatbuilding Company
Shipwrecks in the Gulf of Thailand